El Derbi Madrileño, or simply El Derbi, is the name given to football matches between Real Madrid and Atlético Madrid, both from Madrid. Originally it referred only to those fixtures held in the Spanish championship, but nowadays the term has been generalized, and tends to include every single match between the two clubs (UEFA Champions League, Copa del Rey, etc.).

The two clubs met in Lisbon for the 2014 UEFA Champions League final, making it the first time two clubs from the same city played in the final. After facing off a second time in the 2016 UEFA Champions League final in Milan, with Real Madrid winning as they had two years earlier, they also met in the 2018 UEFA Super Cup, again the first time two clubs from the same city met in that event; it was won by Atlético.

History

The rivalry between the two clubs started at the very beginning of the twentieth century. Madrid Foot-Ball Club (founded 1902), the most powerful club in the Spanish capital, kept on making mergers and acquisitions of the best smaller clubs in the city, which subsequently disappeared. At the same time, Madrid FC also signed the best players from the clubs it did not absorb, which also made those clubs defunct when they were unable to compete against the Whites. The main exception to this pattern was Athletic Club Madrid (founded 1903), who were able to keep most of their best players thanks to the financial aid of their "parent", Athletic Club Bilbao, and so became the last stand against the Madrid FC supremacy in the capital. Many supporters of the clubs that had vanished due to The Real (a recognition given by the King of Spain to his favoured clubs, bestowed upon Madrid FC in 1920, rescinded by the Second Spanish Republic in 1931 and then restored by General Franco in 1940) therefore became supporters of the Red-and-whites, many harbouring dislike towards the meringue club and triggering the rivalry. However, in terms of competitive honours won, Real Madrid were far above Athletic Madrid (who remained so named even after their separation from the original Basque club) until after the Spanish Civil War.

After the war, during the early Francoist period, Atlético became associated with the military air force (and thus renamed Atlético Aviación), although the alleged preference of the regime for the club is subject to discussion, as after winning their very first league title in 1940, Atlético's coach Ricardo Zamora was jailed on charges of being a communist. In any case, during this period Atlético became the most successful club in Spain, reducing the historical gap between the two clubs, until the regime preference shifted towards Real Madrid in the 1950s, as Franco sought to make political capital out of Real Madrid's multiple European Cup titles at a time when Spain was internationally isolated; one minister said, "Real Madrid are the best ambassadors we've ever had." Thus, Atlético fans regularly chanted that Real were "El equipo del gobierno, la vergüenza del país" – "The team of the government, the shame of the country" – and allegedly adopted a more left-wing slant (tempered by the rise of ultras culture, and Rayo Vallecano's presence as the "true" leftist club in Madrid).

In the 1970s, Atlético again took the lead as the most successful Spanish club of the decade, which prompted the Real Madrid fanbase to look down on Atlético calling them and their supporters "Indios" (Indians, a reference to the Latin American players signed by the Red-and-whites). It is worth noting that by then, Real Madrid was not very keen on signing non-Caucasian players (president Santiago Bernabéu even stated, when he decided not to sign Portuguese star Eusebio at the end of the 1960s, "Mientras yo viva, aquí no jugará ningún negro ni un blanco con bigote" ("As long as I live, no black or white with a mustache will play here"). Atlético's supporters accepted the new "Indian" nickname joyfully and have been using it until today. 

The rivalry first gained international attention in 1959 during the European Cup when the two clubs met in the semi-finals. Real won the first leg 2–1 at the Santiago Bernabéu, while Atlético won 1–0 at the Metropolitano. The tie went to a replay, which Real won 2–1. Atlético, however, gained some revenge when, led by former Real Madrid coach José Villalonga, it defeated its city rivals in two successive Copa del Generalísimo finals in 1960 and 1961. In the 1970s, Atlético took again the lead as the most successful Spanish club of the decade, which prompted the Real Madrid fanbase to look down on Atlético calling them and their supporters "Indios" (Indians, a reference to the Latin American players signed by the Red-and-whites). It is worth noting that by then, Real Madrid was not very keen on signing non-Caucasian players (president Santiago Bernabéu even stated, when he decided not to sign Portuguese star Eusebio at the end of the 1960s, "Mientras yo viva, aquí no jugará ningún negro ni un blanco con bigote" ("As long as I live, no black or white with a mustache will play here"). Atlético's supporters accepted the new "Indian" nickname joyfully and have been using it until today.

The Santiago Bernabéu, Real Madrid's stadium named after its former president, is alongside banks and businesses on the upper class Paseo de la Castellana street, while the Vicente Calderón (the stadium that Atlético Madrid used until the 2016–17 season) could be found near a brewery, alongside the Manzanares River and a motorway. Real draw greater support all across the region because of their historically greater resources and success, while Atlético have a relatively working class fan base mainly from the south of the city, with some fans also scattered throughout the city. In fact, the Atlético crest includes the Coat of arms of Madrid, whereas Real crest has no such a reference to the city (instead, it includes a reference to the broader Castile region).

Between 1961 and 1989, when Real dominated La Liga, only Atlético offered it any serious challenge, winning league titles in 1966, 1970, 1973 and 1977. In 1965, Atlético became the first team to beat Real at the Bernabéu in eight years. In the modern era, the Madrid derby is the second biggest derby in Spanish football, behind El Clásico, and although Real Madrid have the larger worldwide fanbase, Atlético Madrid have also amassed a significant worldwide fanbase, due to their level of success in the Champions League and Europa League in the early 21st century. Real Madrid is the most successful club in the Champions League, having won it 14 times. Atlético have never won the Champions League, though they have reached the final on three occasions (losing narrowly to Real Madrid in two of those), and they have also won the Europa League three times since 2010 (compared to two UEFA Cups for Real Madrid in the 1980s) and the UEFA Super Cup three times (one of them against Real Madrid).

On 27 July 2019, Real Madrid and Atlético Madrid faced off in an off-season exhibition match at the 2019 International Champions Cup in the United States, marking the first time the two clubs faced off in a Madrid derby held outside their home country. It wound up setting a record for the highest-scoring Madrid derby, and a blowout win for Atlético Madrid, as they routed Real Madrid 7–3; Atlético Madrid led 5–0 at half time, and Real Madrid only began to rally from behind in the second half of the match.

All matches

Primera División matches

Head-to-head ranking in La Liga (1929–2022)

• Total: Atlético Madrid with 21 higher finishes, Real Madrid with 64 higher finishes (as of the end of the 2021–22 season).

Domestic cups

In domestic cups, the two have been finalists on five occasions in the Copa del Rey in 1960, 1961, 1992, 2013 (all Atlético wins) and 1975 (Real Madrid win). In 1985, they met in the two-legged final of the Copa de la Liga with each winning their home leg, although Real Madrid prevailed on aggregate. In 2014, they met in the two-legged final of the Supercopa de España: the first leg, at the Santiago Bernabéu, finished in a 1–1 draw, while the second leg, at the Vicente Calderón, ended in a 1–0 Atlético victory. With a 2–1 aggregate score, the rojiblancos won the title. They would once again meet in the one-legged final of the Spanish Super Cup in the 2019–20 season, with Real Madrid prevailing 4–1 on penalties following a 0–0 draw after extra time at the King Abdullah Sports City stadium in Jeddah, Saudi Arabia.

Copa del Rey matches

Copa de la Liga matches

Supercopa de España matches

European competitions

The two clubs met in the semi-finals of the 1958–59 European Cup. Atlético had qualified as La Liga runners-up; the Spanish champions, Real Madrid, had already qualified as European Cup holders. The tie finished 2–2 on aggregate, and Real Madrid won the play-off game held in Zaragoza. Real then went on to win the trophy for the fourth consecutive time.

The two clubs met in Lisbon for the 2014 Champions League final, making it the first time two clubs from the same city played in the final. Real Madrid won 4–1 after extra time, earning their tenth European Cup after having last won in 2002. They met again in the quarter-finals of the 2014–15 Champions League. The score was 0–0 at the Vicente Calderón and 1–0 in favour of Real Madrid at the Santiago Bernabéu.

The two rivals met again in Milan for the 2016 Champions League final. After a 1–1 draw, Real Madrid won 5–3 on penalties. They met each other again in the semi-finals of the 2016–17 UEFA Champions League. Atlético were beaten 3–0 in the first leg at the Santiago Bernabéu with all three goals scored by Cristiano Ronaldo. The second leg took place at the Vincente Calderon, which was the last European fixture at the iconic stadium. The home side was victorious, winning 2–1, however they were eliminated once again by their fierce rivals with the final aggregate score being 4–2 to Real who went on to beat Juventus in the 2017 Champions League final.

The two clubs faced each other in the 2018 UEFA Super Cup, with Real having won the 2017–18 Champions League, and Atlético having won the 2017–18 Europa League. Atlético came from behind to win the match 4–2 after extra time for their third Super Cup title. This was the first ever meeting of two teams from the same city in the UEFA Super Cup.

Champions League matches

Super Cup matches

Regional tournaments, friendly cups and club friendlies

Campeonato Regional Centro

Copa Rodriguez Arzuaga

Friendlies

Players who won La Liga titles with both clubs
  Pérez Payá (Atlético Madrid 1950–51; Real Madrid 1953–54, 1954–55)
  Thibaut Courtois (Atlético Madrid 2013–14; Real Madrid 2019–20, 2021–22)

Players who played for both clubs

 1910:  Julián Ruete
 1916:  Juan de Cárcer
 1920:  Santiago Bernabéu
 1928:  Triana
 1928:  Cándido Martínez
 1929:  José Cabo
 1929:  Luis Olaso
 1929:  Cosme Vázquez
 1930:  Francisco Moraleda
 1932:  Eduardo Ordóñez
 1935:  Jaime Lazcano
 1939:  Luis Marín
 1939:  Juan Antonio Ipiña
 1940:  Adolfo Bracero García
 1941:  Pruden
 1952:  Rafael Lesmes
 1953:  José Luis Pérez-Payá
 1964:  Luis Aragonés (via Real Oviedo, then Real Betis)
 1985:  Hugo Sánchez
 1987:  Paco Llorente
 1989:  Joaquín Parra
 1990:  Bernd Schuster
 1991:  Sebastián Losada
 1995:  Miquel Soler (via Barcelona, then Sevilla)
 1996:  Juan Esnáider
 1997:  Pedro Jaro (via Real Betis)
 2000:  Santiago Solari
 2001:  José García Calvo (via Valladolid)
 2003:  Rodrigo Fabri
 2006:  José Manuel Jurado
 2007:  José Antonio Reyes
 2011:  Juanfran (via Osasuna)
 2018:  Antonio Adán (via Cagliari, then Real Betis)
 2018:  Thibaut Courtois (via Chelsea)
 2019:  Álvaro Morata (via Chelsea)
 2019:  Marcos Llorente
 2022:  Sergio Reguilón (via Sevilla, then Tottenham Hotspur)

All-time top scorers

As of 29 September 2018, the top scorer of all time in the Madrid Derby is Cristiano Ronaldo with 22 goals scored. The top scorer for Atlético in the derby matches is Paco Campos, with 12 goals. Players in bold are still active for either club.

Players with most appearances

The player with the most appearances in the Madrid Derby is Sergio Ramos, with 43 appearances. The record of most appearances in the derby matches as an Atlético player is held by Adelardo with 35 matches in all competitions and eight goals scored.

See also
List of association football rivalries
Madrid basketball derby
El Clásico
Derbi barceloní
El Viejo Clásico

References

External links

Official La Liga Web Site 

Real Madrid CF
Madrid
Atlético Madrid
Football in the Community of Madrid
Football in Madrid